The 2016 Tashkent Open was a WTA International tennis tournament played on outdoor hard courts. It was the 18th edition of the Tashkent Open, on the 2016 WTA Tour. It took place at the Tashkent Tennis Center in Tashkent, Uzbekistan, between September 26 and October 1, 2016.

Points and prize money

Point distribution

Prize money

1 Qualifiers prize money is also the Round of 32 prize money
* per team

Singles main-draw entrants

Seeds 

 1 Rankings as of September 19, 2016

Other entrants 
The following players received wildcards into the singles main draw:
  Komola Umarova
  Donna Vekić
  Dayana Yastremska

The following players received entry from the qualifying draw:
  Hiroko Kuwata
  Tereza Martincová
  Sabina Sharipova
  İpek Soylu

The following player received entry as a lucky loser:
  Sofia Shapatava

Withdrawals 
Before the tournament
  Jana Čepelová → replaced by  Sara Sorribes Tormo
  Margarita Gasparyan → replaced by  Patricia Maria Țig
  Hsieh Su-wei → replaced by  Amra Sadiković
  Johanna Larsson → replaced by  Sofia Shapatava
  Galina Voskoboeva → replaced by  Kristýna Plíšková

Retirements 
  Francesca Schiavone
  Lesia Tsurenko

Doubles main-draw entrants

Seeds 

1 Rankings as of September 19, 2016

Other entrants 
The following pairs received wildcards into the doubles main draw:
 Arina Folts /  Komola Umarova
 Polina Merenkova /  Dayana Yastremska

Champions

Singles 

  Kristýna Plíšková def.  Nao Hibino, 6–3, 2–6, 6–3

Doubles 

  Raluca Olaru /  İpek Soylu def.  Demi Schuurs /  Renata Voráčová, 7–5, 6–3

External links 
 

 
2016
2016 in Uzbekistani sport
Tashkent Open